Tanganyika Law Society  is the organisation which is part of the bar association of Tanzania Mainland which was founded in 1954 by an act of parliament-the Tanganyika Law Society Ordinance 1954.

References

African bar associations
Law of Tanzania
Organizations established in 1954